"The Current" is a song by Blue Man Group, released as the first single from their 2003 concept album, The Complex. The song features the guest vocals of Gavin Rossdale of Bush, and was featured in the film, Terminator 3: Rise of the Machines.

Song meaning 
The song deals with urban and occupational isolation, the two key themes from the album. The isolation theme is furthered by the setting,  which takes place in the underground portion of the urban complex—the location of the phone lines, electrical wires, and Internet connections. According to the Blue Man Group themselves, "We wanted to capture the modern paradox of having access to millions of people through electric current but still being cut off from any real human contact."

The song might then be assumed to be about how technology is moving the world forward whilst it moves people backwards.

Promo

Another promo CD was released, in a cardboard slide case.

Track listings

CD single 
"The Current" (Album Version) – 3:49
"The Current" (Tee's Freeze Mix) – 7:40
"The Current" (Blue Radio Mix) – 3:46

12" single 
The Current (Armand Van Helden Club Mix) – 8:40
The Current (Armand Van Helden Dub Mix) – 7:58
The Current (Tee's Freeze Mix) – 7:40
The Current (Blue Radio Mix) – 3:46

Chart positions

Live performances
The song was performed at The Complex concerts, with vocals from Peter Moore. There was a special performance with Rossdale on The Late Late Show with Craig Kilborn.

References 

Blue Man Group songs
Songs written for films
2003 songs